Gipsy Love (German title Zigeunerliebe) is an operetta in three acts by Franz Lehár with a libretto by Alfred Willner and Robert Bodanzky, provided with English translations and revisions by several hands. The story centres on the daughter of a Romanian landowner who is engaged to a man of her own class but is attracted to a gipsy violinist at her engagement party. The brooding, romantic story featured dance music. 

The original production, Zigeunerliebe, had its premiere at the Carltheater, Vienna, on 8 January 1910. A French version, Amour Tzigane, toured France with great success in 1911, and the piece continues to be played in Eastern Europe. The first English-language production of Gipsy Love opened at the Globe Theatre on Broadway, on 17 October 1911, with a libretto and lyrics by Harry B. Smith and Robert B. Smith, and starring Marguerite Sylva. A new translation and revision by Basil Hood and Adrian Ross opened at Daly's Theatre, London, on 1 June 1912. For the London production, George Edwardes had Hood write into the new libretto the comic part of Lady Babby for Gertie Millar. He also imported Hungarian operetta star Sári Petráss for the romantic role of Ilona (renamed from the original Zorika), with W.H. Berry as Dragotin, her father, and with Robert Michaelis and Daisy Burrell. The piece was a flop in New York, but a success in London, running for 299 performances and then touring Great Britain in 1913.

Notes

Sources
Traubner, Richard, Operetta: a theatrical history (London: Routledge, 2004) 
Rodway, Phyllis Philip and Lois Rodway Slingsby. Philip Rodway and a Tale of Two Theatres, Birmingham: Cornish Brothers (1934) ASIN: B0006AMU3O

External links
Gipsy Love at guidetomusicaltheatre.com

Operas by Franz Lehár
English-language operettas
German-language operettas
1910 operas
Romania in fiction
Fictional representations of Romani people